Brandon Dunn (born September 5, 1992) is an American football nose tackle who is a free agent. He played college football at the University of Louisville. He has also been a member of the Chicago Bears and the Houston Texans of the National Football League (NFL).

Early years
Dunn played high school football at Pleasure Ridge Park High School in Louisville, Kentucky, where he was a three-year starter and team captain. He was the team's Most Valuable Player and best offensive lineman in 2009. Dunn was also the team's top defensive lineman in 2008. He recorded 65 tackles and 16 sacks as a senior, including 30 solo tackles. He also recorded 50 tackles and 16 sacks his junior year.

College career
Dunn played for the Louisville Cardinals from 2010 to 2013. He played in 49 games for the Cardinals, starting 30. He recorded career totals  of 101 tackles, 3 sacks, 2 fumble recoveries and 2 pass deflections.

Professional career

Chicago Bears
Dunn was signed by the Chicago Bears on May 11, 2014 after going undrafted in the 2014 NFL Draft. He was released by the Bears on August 30 and signed to the team's practice squad on September 1, 2014. He was promoted to the active roster on November 26, 2014. Dunn made his NFL debut on November 27, 2014 against the Detroit Lions.

Dunn was released by the Bears on September 5, 2015 and signed to the team's practice squad on September 7, 2015. He was promoted to the active roster on September 19, 2015. Dunn was released by the Bears on October 3 and signed to the team's practice squad on October 6, 2015.

Houston Texans
Dunn was signed off the Chicago Bears' practice squad by the Houston Texans on October 13, 2015. On September 3, 2016, he was released by the Texans. Two days later, he was signed to the Texans' practice squad. He was promoted to the active roster on October 5, 2016. He was released on October 13, 2016. He was re-signed to the practice squad two days later. He was signed back to the active roster on October 19, 2016. He was released again on November 26, 2016 and was re-signed to the practice squad. He signed a reserve/future contract with the Texans on January 16, 2017.

On February 19, 2020, Dunn signed a three-year, $12 million contract extension with the Texans. He was placed on injured reserve on December 16, 2020. He was cut during training camp on August 19, 2021.

References

External links
College stats

Living people
1992 births
American football defensive tackles
African-American players of American football
Louisville Cardinals football players
Chicago Bears players
Houston Texans players
Players of American football from Louisville, Kentucky
Pleasure Ridge Park High School alumni
21st-century African-American sportspeople